Shinra may refer to:
Alternative transliteration of Silla, one of the Three Kingdoms of Korea
Shinra Technologies, a subsidiary of Square Enix which closed in 2016

Fictional characters and organisations

Video games
Shinra Electric Power Company, a fictional company in Final Fantasy VII
Rufus Shinra, a character in Final Fantasy VII
Shinra, a minor character in Final Fantasy X-2
Shinra, a character in Ikaruga

Manga and light novels
Shinra Kishitani, one of the main characters in Durarara!!
Shinra Kusakabe, protagonist of the manga series Fire Force
Shinra Tensei, a jutsu (technique) in the Naruto manga series